Rangiora New Life School is a state-integrated Christian area School situated in Southbrook, Rangiora, New Zealand. It was established in 1979 as a private school and integrated into the state education system in March 1994. The school has a roll of  students from years 1 to 13 (approx. ages 5 to 18) as of  many of whom are not of religious conviction (the school having a policy of acceptance towards personal religion). The current principal is Stephen Walters.

It is notable for its high success rate of students passing their respective NCEA qualifications. In 2010, all Year 11 students at the school passed their NCEA Level 1 standards, the highest pass rate in New Zealand.

Staff
Rangiora New Life has 59 staff, including management, teaching, support, administration and property staff .

References

External links

Rangiora
Educational institutions established in 1979
Secondary schools in Canterbury, New Zealand
1979 establishments in New Zealand
Christian schools in New Zealand